Prince William Maurice of Nassau-Siegen (18/28 January 1649 – 23 January 1691Jul.), official titles: Fürst zu Nassau, Graf zu Katzenelnbogen, Vianden, Diez, Limburg und Bronkhorst, Herr zu Beilstein, Stirum, Wisch, Borculo, Lichtenvoorde und Wildenborch, Erbbannerherr des Herzogtums Geldern und der Grafschaft Zutphen, was a count from the House of Nassau-Siegen, a cadet branch of the Ottonian Line of the House of Nassau. He served as an officer in the Dutch States Army. In 1664, he was elevated to the rank and title of prince. In 1679 he became Fürst of Nassau-Siegen, a part of the County of Nassau.

Biography

After the death of their father, William Maurice and his brother Frederick Henry were adopted by their uncle Fürst John Maurice of Nassau-Siegen.

Thus, these properties came into the possession of the House of Nassau.

On 29 April 1663, William Maurice became a hopman of a company of Swiss soldiers in the Dutch States Army. On 20 April 1672 he became lieutenant colonel of an infantry regiment and in 1673 he was promoted to colonel. In 1678 he also became ritmeester of a cavalry company to the repartition of Friesland.

William Maurice and his brother Frederick Henry accompanied their uncle and adoptive father John Maurice on his journey to the city of Siegen, where they arrived on 21/31 August 1663. On 7 January 1664, the two brothers were inaugurated in the town hall of Siegen, where they confirmed the city privileges and liberties. Both brothers were elevated into the Reichsfürstenstand on 6 May 1664.

In 1667 William Maurice became a knight of the Order of Saint John (Bailiwick of Brandenburg, Saxony, Pomerania and Wendland) in Sonnenburg and commander of Grüneberg, and also a knight of the Teutonic Order (Bailiwick of Utrecht) and commander of Tiel.

In October 1672, William Maurice came to the aid of his uncle John Maurice to defend Muiden in the Franco-Dutch War, with a company of soldiers ‘geworben in dem deutschen Stammlanden des Fürsten’, i.e. recruited in Nassau-Siegen.

In 1678, William Maurice was appointed co-regent by John Maurice. A year later, John Maurice died and William Maurice succeeded him as the territorial lord of the Protestant part of the principality of Nassau-Siegen and co-ruler of the city of Siegen. He possessed the district of Siegen (with the exception of seven villages) and the districts of Hilchenbach and Freudenberg. He shared the city of Siegen with his second cousin, John Francis Desideratus, the Catholic Fürst of Nassau-Siegen. William Maurice is described as a man of integrity, but not a man of above-average talent.

William Maurice died in the Nassauischer Hof in Siegen on 23 January 1691Jul., and was buried in the Fürstengruft there on 12 March. He was succeeded by his son Frederick William Adolf, who was under the guardianship and regency of his mother until 1701.

Marriage and issue
William Maurice married at Schaumburg Castle on 6 February 1678Jul. to Princess Ernestine Charlotte of Nassau-Schaumburg (Schaumburg Castle, 20 May 1662Jul. – Nassauischer Hof, Siegen, 21 February 1732), the second daughter of Prince Adolf of Nassau-Schaumburg and Elisabeth Charlotte Melander, Countess of Holzappel.

From the marriage of William Maurice and Ernestine Charlotte the following children were born:
 Fürst Frederick William Adolf (Nassauischer Hof, Siegen, 20 February 1680 – Nassauischer Hof, Siegen, 13 February 1722), succeeded his father in 1691. Married:
 at Homburg Castle on 7 January 1702 to Landgravine Elisabeth Juliana Francisca of Hesse-Homburg (Homburg Castle, 6 January 1681 – Nassauischer Hof, Siegen, 12 November 1707).
 Charles Louis Henry (Nassauischer Hof, Siegen, 17 March 1682Jul. – Nassauischer Hof, Siegen, 18 October 1694Jul.), was hopman of the company of Swiss soldiers in the Dutch States Army, that had been his father’s, since 1691.

Ancestors

Notes

References

Sources
 
 
  (1911). "Willem Maurits, Wilhelm Moritz". In:  en  (redactie), Nieuw Nederlandsch Biografisch Woordenboek (in Dutch). Vol. Eerste deel. Leiden: A.W. Sijthoff. p. 1578.
 
 
 
 
 
 
 
 
 
 
  (2004). "Die Fürstengruft zu Siegen und die darin von 1669 bis 1781 erfolgten Beisetzungen". In:  u.a. (Redaktion), Siegener Beiträge. Jahrbuch für regionale Geschichte (in German). Vol. 9. Siegen: Geschichtswerkstatt Siegen – Arbeitskreis für Regionalgeschichte e.V. p. 183–202.
 
 
  (1882). Het vorstenhuis Oranje-Nassau. Van de vroegste tijden tot heden (in Dutch). Leiden: A.W. Sijthoff/Utrecht: J.L. Beijers.

External links 

 Nassau. In: Medieval Lands. A prosopography of medieval European noble and royal families, compiled by Charles Cawley.
 Nassau Part 5. In: An Online Gotha, by Paul Theroff.
 Nassau-Siegen, Wilhelm Moritz Fürst von (in German). In: Landesgeschichtliches Informationssystem Hessen (LAGIS) (in German).

|-

1649 births
1691 deaths
German Calvinist and Reformed Christians
German military officers
William Maurice of Nassau-Siegen
Order of Saint John (Bailiwick of Brandenburg)
William Maurice of Nassau-Siegen
17th-century German people